Padmalaya  is a village in Erandol taluka of Jalgaon district, Maharashtra, India. It lies 10 km from Erandol and 31.5 km from the district headquarters of Jalgaon. The village is known for the Ganesha temple. A pond is located near this temple.

Etymology
Padmalaya is a portmanteau word blending "Padmasya" and "Alaya", means "Home of Lotus" in Sanskrit. The name is derived from a large lotus pond that is believed to have existed adjacent to a local temple dedicated to Ganesha.  A pond named Bhimkund located few kilometres south of this temple is also a tourist attraction.

Culture
Padmalay temple is a pilgrimage place. Anjani river flows around 1 km from Padmalaya.

Padmalaya is among the two and half Ganapati peeths of India. The temple is also revered as among half Ganapati peeths. The temple has two Ganapati murtis, both are Swayambhu murtis, One idol is known as Aamod and another one is known as Pramod.

This stone temple is built in Hemadpanthi architectural style. The padukas of Shree Govind Maharaj are located in front of the temple. A huge bell weighing 440 kg is next to the padukas.

Legends
Legend states that Bhima had a battle with rakshasa Bakasura and killed him. After the fight Bhim was thirsty, so he slammed his feet on the ground to form a small pond. The pond, called Bhimkund, and is near the temple. Per Mahabharata, Pandavas used to bath in Bhimkund during their exile.

References

External links 

Hindu temples in Maharashtra
Tourist attractions in Jalgaon district
Former populated places in India
Tourist attractions in Maharashtra